John Harper (8 March 1825 – 31 December 1874) was an American politician.  He served as mayor of Denver, Colorado from 1871 to 1872. He was the owner of a hardware store.

References

Mayors of Denver
1825 births
1874 deaths
19th-century American politicians